Maria Taipaleenmäki is a Swedish model and beauty pageant titleholder who was crowned Miss Earth Sweden 2015 and Miss Sweden International 2016.

Biography

Early life
Maria describes her childhood days via Miss Earth official website as, "I grew up in a small community called Hyltebruk where I went to school. I spent much time and was very active in various sports activities. I practiced tennis, floor ball, soccer and gymnastics. Almost all of my friends I met through these activities, I hung out a lot with them because we had the same interests. I really liked being out in nature, I had a private garden plot when I was little which I took care of all by myself. I remember I used to take the bike when my parents gave me my weekly allowance down to the store where I bought the seeds to grow carrots, radishes and various flowers." She also adds, "When I was little I was a silent and shy girl, the girl who always let everyone go ahead of her, the girl who always let people do better than me, the girl who never dared to do anything. With these things , I have learned that you will get nowhere if you do not believe in yourself and always do your best, people are not aware of your inner, they see what you do and with that they obtain an opinion about you. Today I have taken lessons from it and with a smile on my lips I can say I am proud of who I am."

2015: Miss Universe Sweden & Miss Earth

Taipaleenmäki was crowned as Miss Earth Sweden 2015 on 19 July 2015 and became Sweden's representative to be Miss Earth 2015 and would try to succeed Jamie Herrell as the next Miss Earth.

As a Miss Earth delegate, an advocacy is a must. When Taipaleenmäki was asked about her advocacy as Miss Earth, she answered via Miss Earth official website, "As my advocacy I have chosen clean energy focusing on other resources than oil, coal and nuclear. I think that to help mother earth we have to take some drastic steps in the right direction. We have done so much harm to our earth that just thinking about recycling our garbage won’t cut it. We have to think big. We all live in houses and we all drive cars and we all use electricity.

All these consume a lot of oil, coal and nuclear energy and all these resources have a big impact on our planet because of the waste they produce. We have all read about Fukushima in Japan we have all heard about Chernobyl and we all know that even if these things happened years ago they are still troublesome for our environment. In the whole world there are approximately over one billion cars, each of these cars release around 200 grams of carbon dioxide per kilometers that’s around 200,000 tons per kilometer! Who drives their car for just one kilometer you can ease multiplicity that with at least 50 and that’s just the average release of carbon dioxide per day. This is just our cars think of all the industrial facilities and how much toxins they release. We together as humans have to cooperate for the sake of our planet and all the living things to find other energy resources. We have to use solar power, wind power, tidal power and many others we have to put our best minds together and make them more effective. We must adapt these on the geographic locations using solar panels to harvest the energy from the sun in warm countries. Wind power where there is a lot of wind and tidal power near the oceans. We have the capacity to use our oceans as power the earth is 70% water there is plenty of energy for the whole earth. We can use Hydrogen power where the only waste is vaporized water."

When Taipaleenmäki was also asked about how she can promote her country, she replied, "In Sweden , you get much help with your education and we have grants for students and low-interest loans , everything to make it possible for as many as possible to educate themselves I the more people we educate the better society we live in."

2016: Miss International Sweden  
Maria represented Sweden at Miss International 2016.

References

External links
Maria Taipaleenmäki at Miss Earth official website
Miss Earth Sweden 2015 Eco-Beauty Video

1996 births
Living people
People from Hylte Municipality
Swedish people of Finnish descent
Swedish female models
Swedish beauty pageant winners
Miss Earth 2015 contestants
Miss International 2016 delegates